Asopus Vallis is a valley in the Memnonia quadrangle on Mars, located at 4.4° south latitude and 149.7° west longitude.  It is 33 km long and was named after a classical name for the modern Boeotian Asopus river in Greece.

References

Valleys and canyons on Mars
Memnonia quadrangle